Poecilosoma eusebia is a moth of the subfamily Arctiinae. It was described by Herbert Druce in 1883. It is found in Ecuador.

References

External links
Original description: Proceedings of the Zoological Society of London: 373.

Arctiinae
Moths described in 1883